The Diocese of Tehuacán is a Latin Church ecclesiastical territory or diocese of the Catholic Church in Mexico. It is a suffragan in the ecclesiastical province of the metropolitan Archdiocese of Puebla de los Angeles. The Diocese of Tehuacán was erected on 13 January 1962. Its cathedra is found within the Cathedral of the Immaculate Conception of Mary in the episcopal see of Tehuacán, Puebla.

Bishops

Ordinaries
Rafael Ayala y Ayala (1962 -1985) 
Norberto Rivera Carrera (1985 -1995), appointed Archbishop of México, Federal District; elevated to Cardinal in 1998
Mario Espinosa Contreras (1996 -2005), appointed Bishop of Mazatlán, Sinaloa
Rodrigo Aguilar Martínez (2006 -2017), appointed Bishop of San Cristóbal de Las Casas, Chiapas
Gonzalo Alonso Calzada Guerrero (2018 - )

Auxiliary bishop
Lorenzo Cárdenas Aregullín (1978-1980), appointed Bishop of Papantla, Puebla

External links and references

Tehuacan
Puebla
Tehuacan, Roman Catholic Diocese of
Tehuacan
Tehuacan